Shahrak-e Fakhran (also Romanized as Shahrak-e Fakhrān; also known as Fakhrān) is a village in Zohan Rural District, Zohan District, Zirkuh County, South Khorasan Province, Iran. At the 2006 census, its population was 642, in 142 families.

References 

Populated places in Zirkuh County